

Events

Pre-1600
 476 – Romulus Augustulus is deposed when Odoacer proclaims himself "King of Italy", thus ending the Western Roman Empire.
 626 – Li Shimin, posthumously known as Emperor Taizong of Tang, assumes the throne over the Tang dynasty of China.
 929 – Battle of Lenzen: Slavic forces (the Redarii and the Obotrites) are defeated by a Saxon army near the fortified stronghold of Lenzen in Brandenburg.
1260 – The Sienese Ghibellines, supported by the forces of Manfred, King of Sicily, defeat the Florentine Guelphs at Montaperti.
1282 – Peter III of Aragon becomes the King of Sicily.
1479 – The Treaty of Alcáçovas is signed by the Catholic Monarchs of Castile and Aragon on one side and Afonso V and his son, Prince John of Portugal.

1601–1900
1607 – The Flight of the Earls takes place in Ireland.
1666 – In London, England, the most destructive damage from the Great Fire occurs.
1774 – New Caledonia is first sighted by Europeans, during the second voyage of Captain James Cook.
1781 – Los Angeles is founded as El Pueblo de Nuestra Señora La Reina de los Ángeles (The Village of Our Lady, the Queen of the Angels) by 44 Spanish settlers.
1797 – Coup of 18 Fructidor in France.
1800 – The French garrison in Valletta surrenders to British troops who had been called at the invitation of the Maltese. The islands of Malta and Gozo become the Malta Protectorate.
1812 – War of 1812: The Siege of Fort Harrison begins when the fort is set on fire.
1827 – The Great Fire of Turku almost completely destroys Finland's former capital city.
1839 – Battle of Kowloon: British vessels open fire on Chinese war junks enforcing a food sales embargo on the British community in China in the first armed conflict of the First Opium War.
1862 – American Civil War Maryland Campaign: General Robert E. Lee takes the Army of Northern Virginia, and the war, into the North.
1867 – Sheffield Wednesday Football Club are founded at the Adelphi Hotel in Sheffield becoming one of the first football clubs in the world.
1870 – Emperor Napoleon III of France is deposed and the Third Republic is declared.
1882 – The Pearl Street Station in New York City becomes the first power plant to supply electricity to paying customers.
1886 – American Indian Wars: After almost 30 years of fighting, Apache leader Geronimo, with his remaining warriors,  surrenders to General Nelson Miles in Arizona.
1888 – George Eastman registers the trademark Kodak and receives a patent for his camera that uses roll film.

1901–present
1912 – Albanian rebels succeed in their revolt when the Ottoman Empire agrees to fulfill their demands
1919 – Mustafa Kemal Atatürk, who founded the Republic of Turkey, gathers a congress in Sivas to make decisions as to the future of Anatolia and Thrace.
1934 – Evelyn Waugh's novel A Handful of Dust was first published in full.
1936 – Spanish Civil War: Largo Caballero forms a war cabinet to direct the republican war effort.
1939 – World War II: William J. Murphy commands the first Royal Air Force attack on Germany.
1944 – World War II: The British 11th Armoured Division liberates the Belgian city of Antwerp.
  1944   – World War II: Finland exits from the war with Soviet Union. 
1948 – Queen Wilhelmina of the Netherlands abdicates for health reasons.
1949 – The Peekskill riots erupt after a Paul Robeson concert in Peekskill, New York.
1950 – Darlington Raceway is the site of the inaugural Southern 500, the first 500-mile NASCAR race.
1951 – The first live transcontinental television broadcast takes place in San Francisco, from the Japanese Peace Treaty Conference.
1957 – American Civil Rights Movement: Little Rock Crisis: The governor of Arkansas calls out the National Guard to prevent African American students from enrolling in Little Rock Central High School, resulting in the lawsuit Cooper v. Aaron the following year.
1963 – Swissair Flight 306 crashes near Dürrenäsch, Switzerland, killing all 80 people on board.
1964 – Scotland's Forth Road Bridge near Edinburgh officially opens.
1967 – Vietnam War: Operation Swift begins when U.S. Marines engage the North Vietnamese in battle in the Que Son Valley.
1970 – Salvador Allende is elected President of Chile.
1971 – Alaska Airlines Flight 1866 crashes near Juneau, Alaska, killing all 111 people on board.
1972 – Mark Spitz becomes the first competitor to win seven medals at a single Olympic Games.
  1972   – The Price Is Right premieres on CBS. It currently is the longest running game show on American television.
1975 – The Sinai Interim Agreement relating to the Arab–Israeli conflict is signed.
1977 – The Golden Dragon massacre takes place in San Francisco.
1985 – The discovery of Buckminsterfullerene, the first fullerene molecule of carbon.
1989 – In Leipzig, East Germany, the first of weekly demonstration for the legalisation of opposition groups and democratic reforms takes place.
1998 – Google is founded by Larry Page and Sergey Brin, two students at Stanford University.

2001 – Tokyo DisneySea opens to the public as part of the Tokyo Disney Resort in Urayasu, Chiba, Japan.
2002 – The Oakland Athletics win their 20th consecutive game, an American League record.
2007 – Three terrorists suspected to be a part of Al-Qaeda are arrested in Germany after allegedly planning attacks on both the Frankfurt International airport and US military installations.
2010 – A 7.1 magnitude earthquake strikes the South Island of New Zealand causing widespread damage and several power outages.
2020 – Pope Benedict XVI becomes the longest-lived pope, 93 years, four months, 16 days, surpassing Pope Leo XIII, who died in 1903.
2022 – Ten people are killed and 15 are injured in a stabbing spree in 13 locations on the James Smith Cree Nation and in Weldon, Saskatchewan.

Births

Pre-1600
 973 – Al-Biruni, Persian physician and polymath (d. 1048)
1241 – Alexander III, king of Scotland (d. 1286)
1383 – Felix V, antipope of Rome (d. 1451)
1454 – Henry Stafford, 2nd Duke of Buckingham, English politician, Lord High Constable of England (d. 1483)
1557 – Sophie of Mecklenburg-Güstrow, queen consort of Denmark and Norway (d. 1631)
1563 – Wanli, Chinese emperor (d. 1620)
1580 – George Percy, English explorer (d. 1632)
1596 – Constantijn Huygens, Dutch poet and composer (d. 1687)

1601–1900
1681 – Carl Heinrich Biber, Austrian violinist and composer (d. 1749)
1717 – Job Orton, English minister and author (d. 1783)
1745 – Shneur Zalman, Russian rabbi, author and founder of Chabad (d. 1812)
1755 – Axel von Fersen the Younger, Swedish general and politician (d. 1810)
1768 – François-René de Chateaubriand, French historian and politician, Minister of Foreign Affairs for France (d. 1848)
1776 – Stephen Whitney, American businessman (d. 1860)
1798 – Raynold Kaufgetz, Swiss soldier, economist, and politician (d. 1869)
1803 – Sarah Childress Polk, First Lady of the United States (d. 1891)
1809 – Manuel Montt, Chilean scholar and politician, 6th President of Chile (d. 1880)
  1809   – Juliusz Słowacki, Polish poet and playwright (d. 1849)
1824 – Anton Bruckner, Austrian organist and composer (d. 1896)
1825 – Dadabhai Naoroji, Indian academic and politician, President of the Indian National Congress (d. 1917)
1826 – Martin Wiberg, Swedish philosopher and engineer (d. 1905)
1832 – Antonio Agliardi, Italian cardinal (d. 1915)
1846 – Daniel Burnham, American architect, designed the World's Columbian Exposition (d. 1912)
1848 – Lewis Howard Latimer, American inventor (d. 1928)
  1848   – Jennie Lee, American actress (d. 1925)
1850 – Luigi Cadorna, Italian field marshal (d. 1928)
1851 – John Dillon, Irish poet and politician (d. 1927)
1862 – Franjo Krežma, Croatian violinist and composer (d. 1881)
1885 – Antonio Bacci, Italian cardinal (d. 1971)
1886 – Albert Orsborn, English 6th General of The Salvation Army (d. 1967)
1887 – Roy William Neill, Irish-English director, producer, and screenwriter (d. 1946)
1888 – Oskar Schlemmer, German painter, sculptor, designer and choreographer (d. 1943)
1890 – Gunnar Sommerfeldt, Danish actor, director, and screenwriter (d. 1947)
1891 – Fritz Todt, German engineer and politician (d. 1942)
1892 – Darius Milhaud, French composer and educator (d. 1974)
1896 – Antonin Artaud, French actor, director, and playwright (d. 1948)

1901–present
1901 – William Lyons, English businessman, co-founded Jaguar Cars (d. 1985)
1902 – Tommy Mitchell, English cricketer (d. 1996)
1905 – Mary Renault, English-South African author (d. 1983)
  1905   – Walter Zapp, Latvian-Estonian inventor, invented the Minox (d. 2003)
1906 – Ruben Oskar Auervaara, Finnish fraudster (d. 1964)
  1906   – Max Delbrück, German-American biophysicist and academic, Nobel Prize laureate (d. 1981)
1907 – Reggie Nalder, Austrian-American actor (d. 1991)
1908 – Edward Dmytryk, Canadian-American director and producer (d. 1999)
  1908   – Richard Wright, American novelist, short story writer, essayist, and poet (d. 1960)
1909 – Eduard Wirths, German physician (d. 1945)
1910 – Denis Tomlinson, Zimbabwean-South African cricketer (d. 1993)
1912 – Syd Hoff, American author and illustrator (d. 2004)
  1912   – Alexander Liberman, Russian-American publisher, painter, photographer, and sculptor (d. 1999)
1913 – Mickey Cohen, American mob boss (d. 1976)
  1913   – Victor Kiernan, English historian and academic (d. 2009)
  1913   – Stanford Moore, American biochemist and academic, Nobel Prize laureate (d. 1982)
  1913   – Kenzō Tange, Japanese architect, designed the Yoyogi National Gymnasium (d. 2005)
  1913   – Shmuel Wosner, Austrian-Israeli rabbi and author (d. 2015)
1914 – Rudolf Leiding, German businessman (d. 2003)
1917 – Henry Ford II, American businessman (d. 1987)
1918 – Paul Harvey, American radio host (d. 2009)
  1918   – Gerald Wilson, American trumpet player and composer (d. 2014)
1919 – Howard Morris, American actor, director, and screenwriter (d. 2005)
1920 – Clemar Bucci, Argentinian race car driver (d. 2011)
  1920   – Craig Claiborne, American journalist, author, and critic (d. 2000)
  1920   – Konstantin Kalser, German-American film producer and advertising executive (d. 1994)
1922 – Per Olof Sundman, Swedish author and politician (d. 1992)
1923 – Ram Kishore Shukla, Indian lawyer and politician (d. 2003)
1924 – Joan Aiken, English author (d. 2004)
  1924   – Justinas Lagunavičius, Lithuanian basketball player (d. 1997)
1925 – Asa Earl Carter, American Ku Klux Klan leader and author (d. 1979)
1926 – George William Gray, British chemist who developed liquid crystals that made displays possible (d. 2013)
  1926   – Ivan Illich, Austrian priest and philosopher (d. 2002)
  1926   – Bert Olmstead, Canadian ice hockey player and coach (d. 2015)
1927 – John McCarthy, American computer scientist and academic (d. 2011)
  1927   – Ferenc Sánta, Hungarian author and screenwriter (d. 2008)
1928 – Dick York, American actor (d. 1992)
1929 – Thomas Eagleton, American lawyer and politician, 38th Lieutenant Governor of Missouri (d. 2007)
  1929   – Robert V. Keeley, Lebanese-American soldier and diplomat, United States Ambassador to Greece (d. 2015)
1930 – Robert Arneson, American sculptor and academic (d. 1992)
  1930   – William Maxson, American general (d. 2013)
1931 – Mitzi Gaynor, American actress, singer, and dancer
  1931   – Antonios Trakatellis, Greek biochemist and politician
1932 – Carlos Romero Barceló, Puerto Rican lawyer and politician, 5th Governor of Puerto Rico (d. 2021)
1932 – Vince Dooley, American football player and coach
1934 – Clive Granger, Welsh-American economist and academic, Nobel Prize laureate (d. 2009)
  1934   – Antoine Redin, French footballer and manager (d. 2012)
  1934   – Eduard Khil, Russian baritone singer (d. 2012)
  1934   – Jan Švankmajer, Czech filmmaker and artist 
1935 – Charles A. Hines, American general and academic (d. 2013)
  1935   – Dallas Willard, American philosopher and academic (d. 2013)
1937 – Dawn Fraser, Australian swimmer and politician
  1937   – Gene Ludwig, American organist and composer (d. 2010)
  1937   – Virgil A. Richard, American general (d. 2013)
  1937   – Les Allen, English footballer and manager
1939 – Denis Lindsay, South African cricketer and referee (d. 2005)
1941 – Marilena de Souza Chaui, Brazilian philosopher and academic
  1941   – Ken Harrelson, American baseball player and sportscaster
  1941   – Ramesh Sethi, Kenyan cricketer and coach
  1941   – Sushilkumar Shinde, Indian lawyer and politician, 19th Governor of Andhra Pradesh
1942 – Raymond Floyd, American golfer
  1942   – Jerry Jarrett, American wrestler and promoter, co-founded Total Nonstop Action Wrestling
  1942   – Merald "Bubba" Knight, American singer
1944 – Tony Atkinson, English economist and academic (d. 2017) 
  1944   – Dave Bassett, English footballer and manager
  1944   – Gene Parsons, American singer-songwriter, drummer, guitarist, and banjo player
  1944   – Jerry Relph, American politician and member of the Minnesota Senate (d. 2020)
1945 – Danny Gatton, American guitarist (d. 1994)
  1945   – Bill Kenwright, English actor, singer, and producer
1946 – Gary Duncan, American guitarist (d. 2019)
  1946   – Dave Liebman, American saxophonist, flute player, and composer
  1946   – Bryan Mauricette, Saint Lucian-Canadian cricketer
1947 – Bob Jenkins, American sportscaster (d. 2021)
  1947   – Paul Sait, Australian rugby league player 
1949 – Darryl Cotton, Australian singer-songwriter and guitarist (d. 2012)
  1949   – Dean Pees, American football player and coach
  1949   – Tom Watson, American golfer and sportscaster
1950 – Doyle Alexander, American baseball player
1951 – Martin Chambers, English drummer and singer 
  1951   – Judith Ivey, American actress
  1951   – Marita Ulvskog, Swedish politician, Deputy Prime Minister of Sweden
1952 – Stephen Easley, American businessman and politician (d. 2013)
1953 – Janet Biehl, American philosopher and author
  1953   – Michael Stean, English chess player and author
  1953   – Fatih Terim, Turkish footballer and manager
1955 – David Broza, Israeli singer-songwriter and guitarist
  1955   – Garth Le Roux, South African cricketer
  1955   – Brian Schweitzer, American politician, 23rd Governor of Montana
1956 – Blackie Lawless, American singer-songwriter and guitarist
1957 – Khandi Alexander, American actress, dancer, and choreographer
1958 – Jacqueline Hewitt, American astrophysicist and astronomer
  1958   – Marzio Innocenti, Italian rugby player and coach
  1958   – Drew Pinsky, American radio and television host
1959 – Kevin Harrington, Australian actor 
  1959   – Armin Kogler, Austrian ski jumper
1960 – Kim Thayil, American guitarist and songwriter 
  1960   – Shailesh Vara, Ugandan-English lawyer and politician
  1960   – Damon Wayans, American actor, director, producer, and screenwriter
1961 – Nick Blinko, English singer-songwriter and guitarist 
  1961   – Lars Jönsson, Swedish film producer
1962 – Kiran More, Indian cricketer
  1962   – Ulla Tørnæs, Danish politician, Danish Minister of Education
  1962   – Shinya Yamanaka, Japanese physician and biologist, Nobel Prize laureate
1963 – Bobby Jarzombek, American drummer 
  1963   – John Vanbiesbrouck, American ice hockey player, coach, and manager
  1963   – Sami Yaffa, Finnish singer-songwriter and bass player 
1964 – Guy Boros, American golfer 
  1964   – Aadesh Shrivastava, Indian singer-songwriter (d. 2015)
1965 – Sergio Momesso, Canadian ice hockey player and sportscaster
1966 – Yanka Dyagileva, Russian singer-songwriter (d. 1991)
  1966   – Jeff Tremaine, American director, producer, and screenwriter
1967 – Darrin Murray, New Zealand cricketer and accountant
  1967   – Dezső Szabó, Hungarian decathlete
1968 – John DiMaggio, American voice actor 
  1968   – Mike Piazza, American baseball player 
1969 – Sasha, Welsh DJ and producer 
  1969   – Ramon Dekkers, Dutch kick-boxer and mixed martial artist (d. 2013)
  1969   – Giorgi Margvelashvili, Georgian academic and politician, 4th President of Georgia
  1969   – Inga Tuigamala, Samoan-New Zealand rugby player
1970 – Igor Cavalera, Brazilian drummer 
  1970   – Deni Hines, Australian singer-songwriter
  1970   – Ivan Iusco, Italian composer
  1970   – Sven Meyer, German footballer
1971 – Lance Klusener, South African cricketer and coach
  1971   – Ione Skye, English-American actress
  1971   – Maik Taylor, German-Irish footballer and coach
1972 – Steve Leonard, Northern Irish veterinarian and television personality
1973 – Jason David Frank, American actor and mixed martial artist, best known as Tommy Oliver from the Power Rangers franchise (d.2022)
1973 – Aaron Fultz, American baseball player and coach
  1973   – Lazlow Jones, American radio presenter, producer and screenwriter 
1974 – Mati Pari, Estonian footballer and coach
  1974   – Lincoln Roberts, Tobagonian cricketer
1975 – Sergio Ballesteros, Spanish footballer
  1975   – Mark Ronson, English DJ, producer, and songwriter, co-founded Allido Records
  1975   – Dave Salmoni, Canadian zoologist, television host, and producer
1976 – Denilson Martins Nascimento, Brazilian footballer
  1976   – Mario-Ernesto Rodríguez, Uruguayan-Italian footballer
1977 – Sun-woo Kim, South Korean baseball player
  1977   – Lucie Silvas, English singer-songwriter and pianist
  1977   – Kia Stevens, American wrestler
1978 – Wes Bentley, American actor and producer
  1978   – Terence Newman, American football player
  1978   – Frederik Veuchelen, Belgian cyclist
  1978   – Christian Walz, Swedish singer-songwriter and producer
1979 – Maxim Afinogenov, Russian ice hockey player
  1979   – Pedro Macedo Camacho, Portuguese pianist, composer, and producer
  1979   – Kosuke Matsuura, Japanese race car driver
1980 – Max Greenfield, American actor
  1980   – Pat Neshek, American baseball player
1981 – Beyoncé, American singer-songwriter, producer, dancer, and actress
  1981   – Richard Garcia, Australian footballer
  1981   – Lacey Sturm, American singer-songwriter 
1982 – Whitney Cummings, American comedian, actress, producer, and screenwriter
  1982   – Mark Lewis-Francis, English sprinter
1983 – Yuichi Nakamaru, Japanese singer-songwriter, actor, and radio host 
  1983   – Guy Pnini, Israeli basketball player
  1983   – Margit Rüütel, Estonian tennis player
  1983   – Armands Šķēle, Latvian basketball player
1984 – Jonathan Adam, Scottish race car driver
  1984   – Hamish McIntosh, Australian footballer
  1984   – Kyle Mooney, American comedian, actor, and screenwriter
1985 – Raúl Albiol, Spanish footballer
  1985   – Ri Kwang-chon, North Korean footballer
  1985   – Walid Mesloub, Algerian footballer
1986 – Ayumi Kaihori, Japanese footballer
  1986   – Xavier Woods, American wrestler
1987 – Wesley Blake, American wrestler
1988 – John Tyler Hammons, American politician
1989 – Elliott Whitehead, English rugby league player
1990 – James Bay, English singer-songwriter and guitarist
  1990   – Jonny Lomax, English rugby player
  1990   – Danny Worsnop, English singer-songwriter
1991 – Adrien Bart, French sprint canoeist
  1991   – Anders Zachariassen, Danish handball player
1992 – Hanna Schwamborn, German actress
  1992   – Kevin Lee, American mixed martial artist
  1992   – Zerkaa, English YouTuber
1993 – Emma Brownlie, Scottish footballer
  1993   – Yannick Carrasco, Belgian footballer
  1993   – Jody Fannin, English race car driver
  1993   – Chantal Škamlová, Slovak tennis player
1994 – Kenny McEvoy, Irish footballer
  1994   – Sabina Sharipova, Uzbekistan tennis player
  1994   – Thomas Minns, English rugby player
1995 – Jazz Tevaga, New Zealand rugby league player
1996 – Jordan Lilley, English rugby league player
  1996   – Ashton Golding, English rugby league player
1998 – Neru Nagahama, Japanese tarento

Deaths

Pre-1600
 422 – Boniface I, pope of the Catholic Church
 799 – Musa al-Kadhim, Arabic imam (b. 745)
1037 – Bermudo III, king of León (b. c. 1017)
1063 – Tughril, Seljuq sultan (b. 990)
1199 – Joan of England, queen of Sicily (b. 1165)
1308 – Margaret of Burgundy, queen of Sicily (b. 1250)
1323 – Gegeen Khan, Chinese emperor (b. 1302)
1332 – García de Ayerbe, Spanish bishop and crusade theorist
1342 – Anna Anachoutlou, empress of Trebizond
1416 – John I, Count of Nassau-Siegen, German count
1417 – Robert Hallam, English Catholic bishop
1537 – Johann Dietenberger, German theologian and translator (b. 1475)
1571 – Matthew Stewart, 4th Earl of Lennox, English nobleman (b. 1516)
1588 – Robert Dudley, 1st Earl of Leicester, English academic and politician, Lord Lieutenant of Norfolk (b. 1532)

1601–1900
1625 – Thomas Smythe, English diplomat (b. 1558)
1676 – John Ogilby, Scottish-born impresario and cartographer (b. 1600)
1767 – Charles Townshend, English politician, Chancellor of the Exchequer (b. 1725)
1780 – John Fielding, English lawyer and judge (b. 1721)
1784 – César-François Cassini de Thury, French astronomer and cartographer (b. 1714)
1794 – John Hely-Hutchinson, Anglo-Irish lawyer and politician (b. 1724)
1804 – Richard Somers, American lieutenant (b. 1778)
1820 – Timothy Brown, English banker and merchant (b. 1743/4)
1821 – José Miguel Carrera, Chilean general and politician (b. 1785)
1849 – Friedrich Laun, German author (b. 1770)
1852 – William MacGillivray, Scottish biologist and ornithologist (b. 1796)
1864 – John Hunt Morgan, American general (b. 1825)

1901–present
1907 – Edvard Grieg, Norwegian pianist and composer (b. 1843)
1909 – Clyde Fitch, American playwright and songwriter (b. 1865)
1911 – John Francon Williams, Welsh-born writer, journalist, geographer, historian, cartographer and inventor (b. 1854)
1914 – Charles Péguy, French poet and philosopher (b. 1873)
1923 – Howdy Wilcox, American racing driver (b. 1889) 
1940 – George William de Carteret, French-English journalist and author (b. 1869)
1944 – Erich Fellgiebel, German general (b. 1886)
1963 – Robert Schuman, Luxembourgian-French politician, 130th Prime Minister of France (b. 1886)
1965 – Albert Schweitzer, French-Gabonese physician, theologian, and missionary, Nobel Prize laureate (b. 1875)
1974 – Creighton Abrams, American general (b. 1914)
  1974   – Marcel Achard, French playwright and screenwriter (b. 1899)
  1974   – Charles Arnison, English airman (b. 1893)
  1974   – Lewi Pethrus, Swedish minister and hymn-writer (b. 1884)
1977 – Stelios Perpiniadis, Greek singer-songwriter and guitarist (b. 1899)
  1977   – Jean Rostand, French biologist and philosopher (b. 1894)
  1977   – E. F. Schumacher, German-English economist and statistician (b. 1911)
1982 – Jack Tworkov, Polish-American painter (b. 1900)
1985 – Vasyl Stus, Ukrainian poet, publicist, and dissident (b. 1938)
  1985   – George O'Brien, American actor and singer (b. 1899)
1986 – Otto Glória, Brazilian footballer and manager (b. 1917)
  1986   – Hank Greenberg, American baseball player and manager (b. 1911)
1987 – Bill Bowes, English cricketer and coach (b. 1908)
1989 – Georges Simenon, Belgian-Swiss author (b. 1903)
  1989   – Ronald Syme, New Zealand historian and author (b. 1903)
1990 – Lawrence A. Cremin, American historian and author (b. 1925)
  1990   – Irene Dunne, American actress and singer (b. 1898)
  1990   – Turan Dursun, Turkish scholar and author (b. 1934)
1991 – Charlie Barnet, American saxophonist, composer, and bandleader (b. 1913)
  1991   – Tom Tryon, American actor and author (b. 1926)
  1991   – Dottie West, American singer-songwriter and actress (b. 1932)
1993 – Hervé Villechaize, French-American actor (b. 1943)
1995 – Chuck Greenberg, American saxophonist, composer, and producer (b. 1950)
  1995   – William Kunstler, American lawyer and activist (b. 1919)
1996 – Joan Clarke, English cryptanalyst and numismatist (b. 1917)
  1996   – Rose Ouellette, Canadian actress and manager (b. 1903)
1997 – Dharamvir Bharati, Indian author, poet, and playwright (b. 1926)
  1997   – Aldo Rossi, Italian architect, designed the Bonnefanten Museum and Teatro Carlo Felice (b. 1931)
1998 – Ernst Jaakson, Estonian diplomat (b. 1905)
  1998   – Elizabeth Kata, Australian author and screenwriter (b. 1912)
1999 – Georg Gawliczek, German footballer and manager (b. 1919)
2002 – Vlado Perlemuter, Lithuanian-French pianist and educator (b. 1904)
2003 – Lola Bobesco, Romanian-Belgian violinist and educator (b. 1921)
  2003   – Tibor Varga, Hungarian violinist and conductor (b. 1921)
2004 – Alphonso Ford, American basketball player (b. 1971)
  2004   – Moe Norman, Canadian golfer (b. 1929)
2006 – Giacinto Facchetti, Italian footballer and manager (b. 1942)
  2006   – Steve Irwin, Australian zoologist and television host (b. 1962)
  2006   – Colin Thiele, Australian author, poet, and educator (b. 1920)
  2006   – Astrid Varnay, Swedish-American soprano (b. 1918)
2007 – John Scott, 9th Duke of Buccleuch, Scottish soldier and politician, Lord Lieutenant of Roxburghshire (b. 1923)
2011 – Lee Roy Selmon, American football player (b. 1954)
2012 – Abraham Avigdorov, Israeli soldier (b. 1929)
  2012   – Albert Marre, American actor, director, and producer (b. 1924)
  2012   – George Savitsky, American football player (b. 1924)
  2012   – Syed Mustafa Siraj, Indian author (b. 1930)
  2012   – Hakam Sufi, Indian singer-songwriter (b. 1952)
2013 – Michel Pagé, Canadian businessman and politician (b. 1949)
  2013   – Dick Raaymakers, Dutch composer and theorist (b. 1930)
  2013   – Daniele Seccarecci, Italian bodybuilder (b. 1980)
  2013   – Stanislav Stepashkin, Russian boxer (b. 1940)
  2013   – Casey Viator, American bodybuilder and journalist (b. 1951)
2014 – Ron Mulock, Australian lawyer and politician, 10th Deputy Premier of New South Wales (b. 1930)
  2014   – Gustavo Cerati, Argentine Musician (b.1959)
  2014   – Wolfhart Pannenberg, Polish-German theologian and academic (b. 1928)
  2014   – Joan Rivers, American comedian, television host, and author (b. 1933)
2015 – Graham Brazier, New Zealand singer-songwriter (b. 1952)
  2015   – Jean Darling, American actress (b. 1922)
  2015   – Wilfred de Souza, Indian surgeon and politician, 7th Chief Minister of Goa (b. 1927)
  2015   – Warren Murphy, American author and screenwriter (b. 1933)
2016 – Clarence D. Rappleyea Jr., lawyer and politician (b. 1933)
2018 – Bill Daily, American actor, comedian (b. 1927)
2020 – Lloyd Cadena, Filipino YouTuber and vlogger (b. 1993)
2021 – Tunch Ilkin, Turkish-American football player (b. 1957)
  2021   – Willard Scott, American weather presenter and television personality (b. 1934)
2022 – Cyrus Mistry, Indian-Irish businessman (b. 1968)
  2022   – Peter Straub, American novelist (b. 1943)

Holidays and observances
Christian feast day:
Candida the Elder
Blessed Catherine of Racconigi
Blessed Dina Bélanger
Hermione of Ephesus
Ida of Herzfeld
Irmgardis (of Süchteln)
Moses and Aaron (Lutheran Church and Eastern Orthodox Church)
Paul Jones (Episcopal Church)
Rosalia
Rose of Viterbo
Rufinus, Silvanus, and Vitalicus
Thamel and companions
Ultan of Ardbraccan
September 4 (Eastern Orthodox liturgics)
Immigrant's Day (Argentina)
Newspaper Carrier Day (United States)
Toothfish Day (South Georgia and the South Sandwich Islands)

References

External links

 
 
 

Days of the year
September